The  Calvaria Church  is a Roman Catholic religious building in Satu Mare, Romania, and one of the oldest churches in the city. Located on Mihai Eminescu Street, it was originally built in 1844, and stands in place of  the old fortress Castrum-Zothmar. Its original walls broke after the foundation caved over the sandy ground. The church was rebuilt from the ground up by the Weszelovszky brothers, in 1908–1909.

References

External links
 Description

History of Satu Mare
Roman Catholic churches completed in 1884
Churches in Satu Mare
Historic monuments in Satu Mare County
19th-century Roman Catholic church buildings in Romania